Telvent (a portmanteau of "Telecom Ventures") was an information technology and industrial automation company specializing in SCADA, GIS and related IT systems for pipeline, energy utility, traffic, agriculture and environmental monitoring industries. Their customer base is worldwide, but concentrated in Spain and North America. In 2011, Telvent was acquired by the Schneider Electric group. In 2014 it was integrated into Getronics.

See also 
 Data Transmission Network (Telvent DTN)
 Abengoa
 Schneider Electric

References 

Companies formerly listed on the Nasdaq
Schneider Electric